Zsófia Földházi (born 9 June 1993) is a Hungarian modern pentathlete. She has qualified for 2016 Summer Olympics.

References

External links

1993 births
Living people
Hungarian female modern pentathletes
Olympic modern pentathletes of Hungary
Modern pentathletes at the 2016 Summer Olympics
Modern pentathletes at the 2010 Summer Youth Olympics
World Modern Pentathlon Championships medalists
Sportspeople from Budapest